Sahiwal cattle is a breed of zebu cow, named after an area in the Punjab, Pakistan. The cattle is mainly found in Punjab province of Pakistan, and Indian states of Punjab, Haryana, & Rajasthan.

Sahiwal is considered a heat-tolerant cattle breed.

History

The Sahiwal originated in the dry Punjab region which lies along central Punjab. They were once kept in large herds by professional herdsmen called "Charwahas". With the introduction of irrigation systems to the region they began to be kept in smaller numbers by the farmers of the region, who used them as draught and dairy animals. Today the Sahiwal is one of the best dairy breeds in India and Pakistan. Sahiwal is calm when milking. Due to their heat tolerance and high milk production they have been exported to other Asian countries as well as Africa and the Caribbean.

Distribution

Due to its unique characteristics, Sahiwal breed is exported to wide list of countries and regions. The Sahiwal breed arrived in Australia via New Guinea in the early 1950s. In Australia, the Sahiwal breed was initially selected as a dual-purpose breed. It played a valuable role in the development of the two Australian tropical dairy breeds, the Australian Milking Zebu and the Australian Friesian Sahiwal. Sahiwal cattle are now predominantly used in Australia for beef production, as crossing high-grade Sahiwal sires with European breeds produced a carcass of lean quality with desirable fat cover. Sahiwal bulls have demonstrated the ability to sire small, fast-growing calves, noted for their hardiness under unfavorable climatic conditions.

The contribution of the Sahiwal breed to adaptability is well documented in Kenya, Jamaica, Guyana, Burundi, Somalia, Sierra Leone, Nigeria and several ecological zones of Africa where Sahiwals have been crossed with exotic Bos taurus breeds that have a high response capability for milk and beef production but lack adaptability to local conditions. The present Sahiwal cattle in Kenya are descendants of some 60 bulls and 12 cows imported between 1939 and 1963. The Sahiwal breed also is considered unequalled in transmitted effects for milk production among Bos indicus breeds. Kenya is the main country in Africa with major resources of Bos indicus Sahiwal cattle and serves as an important source of stock and semen for the continent.

Similarly, this breed is also exported to many other regions of Asia including India. The cows are the heaviest milkers of all zebu breeds and display a well-developed udder. In Pakistan the breed is being conserved by the Research Centre for Conservation of Sahiwal Cattle.

See also
 Australian Friesian Sahiwal
 Red Sindhi cattle
 Tharparkar cattle

References

Livestock in Punjab
Cattle breeds originating in India
Cattle breeds originating in Pakistan
Cattle breeds
Fauna of Pakistan